Harold Walker, Baron Walker of Doncaster, PC, DL (12 July 1927 – 11 November 2003) was an English Labour politician.

Born in Audenshaw, Walker was educated at Manchester College of Technology and became a toolmaker. He served in the Royal Navy's Fleet Air Arm and was a lecturer for the National Council of Labour Colleges.

Walker was elected Member of Parliament for Doncaster (after 1983 Doncaster Central) at the 1964 general election. He was a junior whip and then junior employment minister in the first Harold Wilson government, and continued being spokesman on employment in opposition, returning to the ministry in 1974. He was Minister of State at the Department of Employment 1976-79 and he became a Privy Counsellor in 1979. When Labour lost the election that year, Walker became the opposition spokesman for employment and training.

Walker left the employment brief in 1983 following that year's general election, and became Chairman of Ways and Means & Deputy Speaker to Bernard Weatherill. He did not, however, become Speaker when Weatherill retired in 1992, that honour instead going to Betty Boothroyd. He was knighted that year and returned to the backbenches until his retirement.

Walker retired in 1997 and was created a life peer as Baron Walker of Doncaster, of Audenshaw in the County of Greater Manchester on 26 September 1997. In 1998 he became a Deputy Lieutenant of South Yorkshire and Honorary Freeman of Doncaster.

Walker died in November 2003, aged 76.

References

External links 
 

1927 births
2003 deaths
Amalgamated Engineering Union-sponsored MPs
Deputy Lieutenants of South Yorkshire
Deputy Speakers of the British House of Commons
Knights Bachelor
Labour Party (UK) MPs for English constituencies
Walker of Doncaster
Life peers created by Elizabeth II
Members of the Privy Council of the United Kingdom
Ministers in the Wilson governments, 1964–1970
People from Audenshaw
UK MPs 1964–1966
UK MPs 1966–1970
UK MPs 1970–1974
UK MPs 1974
UK MPs 1974–1979
UK MPs 1979–1983
UK MPs 1983–1987
UK MPs 1987–1992
UK MPs 1992–1997